Jagat is a Block and Nagar panchayat in Budaun Tehsil and Budaun district, Uttar Pradesh, India. Its block code is 0181. According to 2011 Census of India the total population of the town is 7,787, out of 4,112 are males and 3,675 are females.

References 

Villages in Budaun district
Blocks in Budaun District